Hugoline van Hoorn (born   1970) is a female Dutch former professional squash player who represented the Netherlands. She reached a career-high world ranking of 21 in 1995. She was Dutch champion four times.

References

1970 births
Living people
Dutch female squash players